The Stout 2-AT Pullman, or "Air Pullman", was a single engine all-metal monoplane that was used for early airline travel and air mail transport in America.

Development
William Bushnell Stout started in aviation working for Packard on the Liberty engine during World War I. He promoted early innovative designs, based on the 1915 innovations of German aviation engineer Hugo Junkers, such as a blended wing concept, and pioneered all-metal aircraft construction in America using Junkers-devised concepts. The 2-AT was a more conventional layout using the familiar and plentiful Liberty engine of the time.

The first use of the nickname "Tin Goose" was applied to this aircraft by the news media. The name was later attributed to the Ford Trimotor.

Design
The 2-AT was a high-wing conventional gear monoplane. The original design featured an open cockpit for the pilots, followed by an enclosed cockpit with opening side windows. The aircraft featured wallpaper, padded seats, semi-circular opening windows, and a bathroom. It was the first all-metal aircraft certified in America. It was eventually redesigned to accommodate three engines, becoming the Stout 3-AT trimotor, and again redesigned to become the more well-known Ford Trimotor. The aircraft was under development as a Stout aircraft when Ford bought all controlling interests, creating the Stout Metal Airplane Division of the Ford Motor Company. Development hastened with the infusion of resources from Ford.

Stout's chief engineer, George H. Prudden, was credited for the new wing design using principles from Stout's earlier "thick wing" aircraft. Each 2-AT was powered by a Liberty engine, one example was tested with a Pratt and Whitney Wasp radial engine.

Operational history
The first flight was performed by Walter Edwin Lees at Selfridge Field. The windshield blew in locking the controls, forcing a landing on a frozen lake. In 1925 the 2-AT was demonstrated at the Ford National Reliability Air Tour by E.G. Hamilton. While just completing the event would have won an award, the 2-AT completed it with a perfect score. At the Air Tour, the first aircraft sale was announced. It was sold to John Wanamaker & Co. to haul passengers and freight between Philadelphia and New York. Wanamaker's was an early seller of Ford products, and in turn became the first reseller of Ford aircraft, displaying the aircraft in their New York showroom. The 2-AT was listed in their lineup for $25,000.

The United States Postal Office ordered one model for airmail service. The aircraft was modified with a  Packard engine.

The aircraft were put into service for the newly formed Ford Air Transport Service in 1925. The first 2-AT was built at the Stout factory in Dearborn and called the "Maiden Detroit". The aircraft was outfitted with a nickel-plated Liberty engine bought from a trophy case at the Marmon assembly plant. The other aircraft in the fleet were also 2-AT's, named "Maiden Dearborn I, II, III and IV". Initially the aircraft were for Ford's company use. The first scheduled commercial flights in America were begun when The "Maiden Detroit" flew  of freight between factories in Detroit and Chicago on April 14, 1925. 
Ford Air Transport served routes between Chicago, Detroit and Cleveland.

The "Maiden Detroit" entered Contract Air Mail service on February 15, 1926. The aircraft flew from Detroit to Cleveland with the first commercial transport of air mail. The routes would be known as CAM-6 (Detroit to Cleveland), and CAM-7 (Detroit to Chicago).

Four aircraft were sold to Florida Airways. The first three were given in exchange for a stake in the airline by Henry Ford. One was used on CAM-10 (Atlanta to Jacksonville).

On May 18, 1926, at Argo, Illinois, a Ford Air Transport 2-AT Maiden Deaborn I was involved in the first fatal accident for a commercial US aircraft. The Contract Air Mail pilot crashed and was killed due to flight into poor weather conditions.

In 1928, U.S. Commerce department declared the wings to be structurally unsafe. All remaining 2-AT's were scrapped.

Variants
 Stout 3-AT - A trimotor 2-AT powered with Wright J-4 engines.

Specifications Stout 2-AT Pullman

See also

References

External links

1920s United States civil utility aircraft
High-wing aircraft
Single-engined tractor aircraft
1920s United States airliners
Aircraft first flown in 1924